Ruru Kshetra, also known as Ridi (रिडी), is a religious and cultural place situated on the confluence of Ridi Khola and Kaligandaki river in Nepal. It is also tri-junction of Gulmi, Palpa and Syangja districts. It is one of the Char Dhams in Nepal.

An age long fair 'Ridi Mela' is held during Maghe Sankranti for three days. The first, second and third days are called as Jethi Sankranti, Maili Sankranti and Kanchhi Sankranti respectively. It is believed  to obtain Moksha if one take holy bath on Kaligandaki river for the three days and worship in Rishikesh Temple. The Rishikesh Complex of Ruru Kshetra is in UNESCO World Heritage tentative list.

Shaligram, the symbol of Lord Vishnu, is found here on the bank of Kaligandaki river.

History
Mukund Sen, the first king of Palpa, discovered the deity of God Rishikesh while having holy dip in Kaligandaki river and established the temple of Rishikesh.

See also
Rishikesh Complex of Ruru Kshetra

References 

Hindu pilgrimage sites in Nepal
Char Dham temples in Nepal
Buildings and structures in Gulmi District